The Edmonton Elks are a professional Canadian football team based in Edmonton, Alberta, and are members of the West Division in the Canadian Football League (CFL). 

Edmonton was founded in 1949, although other teams named the Edmonton Eskimos existed 1895 to 1923 and 1929 to 1939.

The Edmonton Elks are the most successful CFL franchise of the modern era (1949–present), having won the league's Grey Cup fourteen times (As the Eskimos), including an unmatched five consecutive wins between 1978 and 1982, and most recently in 2015.

Key

Head coaches
Note: Statistics are current through the end of the 2022 CFL season.

Notes
 A running total of the number of coaches of the Eskimos/Elks. Thus, any coach who has two or more separate terms as head coach is only counted once.
 Each year is linked to an article about that particular CFL season.

References
General

Specific

Lists of Canadian Football League head coaches by team
Edmonton Elks lists